Charles Journet (26 January 1891 – 15 April 1975) was a Swiss Roman Catholic theologian. He was the first Swiss named a cardinal.

Journet has been considered a figure of holiness and a candidate for canonisation; he has been accorded the title servant of God.

Life
Charles Journet was born in Geneva in 1891 as the son of Jean-Louis Journet and Jenny Bondat. He was baptized on the same day in the church of Sacré-Coeur and Confirmed there on 12 June 1903 by Bishop Joseph Déruaz.

He studied at the seminary in Fribourg before being ordained to the priesthood on 15 July 1917. He then did pastoral work in the Diocese of Fribourg until 1924 and taught at the seminary there from 1924 to 1965. He established the theological journal Nova et Vetera in 1926.

Journet was raised to the rank of domestic prelate of his holiness on 13 August 1946 by Pope Pius XII.

Pope Paul VI announce on 25 January 1965 that he planned to make Journet a cardinal. On 15 February 1965, Journet was appointed titular archbishop of Furnos Minor. He received his episcopal consecration on 20 February from Bishop François Charrière, with Bishops Franz von Streng and Louis-Sevérin Haller as co-consecrators.

In the consistory two days later, on 22 February, he was one of the three European theologians elevated to the College of Cardinals by Paul VI, who made him cardinal deacon of Santa Maria in Campitelli.

Although he only attended the last session of the Second Vatican Council in 1965, Journet was nevertheless a rather influential figure at the council. He supported the documents Dignitatis humanae and Nostra aetate while also affirming the Church's traditional teaching on divorce. Journet was a close friend of the renowned philosopher Jacques Maritain, with whom he founded the theological journal Nova et Vetera in 1926.

A supporter of Socialist leader Miguel Arraes, the cardinal protested his imprisonment by the Brazilian military in the 1960s.

He was protodeacon from the following 10 August 1971 until he opted to become a cardinal priest on 5 March 1973. His best-known work is considered to be The Church of the Word Incarnate.

He is also seen as the mentor of Swiss Cardinal Georges Cottier.

Journet died in Fribourg at the age of 84 on 15 April 1975. He is buried in the Chartreuse de la Valsainte in Gruyères.

Beatification process
His beatification cause has been approved. The Congregation for the Causes of Saints gave their approval and granted him the title servant of God.

References

External links
 
Catholic-Hierarchy 
Cardinals of the Holy Roman Church
Journet's Theology of the Church
The Meaning of Grace

1891 births
1975 deaths
20th-century venerated Christians
20th-century Swiss Roman Catholic theologians
Clergy from Geneva
Swiss cardinals
20th-century Swiss Roman Catholic priests
Protodeacons
Participants in the Second Vatican Council
Cardinals created by Pope Paul VI
Swiss Servants of God